Gołąb (meaning "dove") may refer to:

Gołąb (surname)
Gołąb, Chełm County in Lublin Voivodeship (east Poland)
Gołąb, Lubartów County in Lublin Voivodeship (east Poland)
Gołąb, Puławy County in Lublin Voivodeship (east Poland)
Battle of Gołąb, between Polish-Lithuanian Commonwealth and Swedish Empire

See also
Golomb
Gołąbki